was a town located in Minamiazumi District, Nagano Prefecture, Japan.

As of 2003, the town had an estimated population of 31,980 and a density of 219.91 persons per km². The total area was 145.42 km².

On October 1, 2005, Hotaka, along with the town of Akashina (from Higashichikuma District), the town of Toyoshina, and the villages of Horigane and Misato (all from Minamiazumi District), was merged to create the city of Azumino.

External links
 Azumino official website 

Dissolved municipalities of Nagano Prefecture
Azumino, Nagano